The following lists events that happened during 1959 in Chile.

Incumbents
President of Chile: Jorge Alessandri

Events

January
16 January - The 1959 FIBA World Championship is held in the country. The tournament takes place in the cities of Antofagasta, Valparaíso, Santiago, Concepción and Temuco.
19 January – Interior Minister Enrique Ortuzar resigns on health grounds.

March
6 March - It is inaugurated St.Matthew's College in the city of Osorno.

June
13 June - The IANSA Linares plant is inaugurated.

July
31 July - The D.F.L. No. 2. It is established as the deadline in which the building can be regularized as old according to the General Ordinance of Urban Planning and Construction.

August
August 21 - The Television Corporation of the Pontifical Catholic University of Chile, the second Chilean television channel, currently known as Canal 13, begins its transmissions.
August 22 - Regular broadcasts of UCV Television begin in the city of Valparaíso.

November
November 7 - Radio Andrés Bello begins its broadcasts.

December
December 1 - In Washington D.C., (United States), Chile signs the Antarctic Treaty. Through its provisions, the treaty prevents the denial or affirmation of sovereignty over the white continent.

Births
1 January – Cecilia Serrano
13 February – Luis Hormazábal
20 May – Juan Carlos Letelier 
30 June – Rodrigo Jordan
30 July – Sergio Pacheco
1 October – Leo Caprile
3 October – Luis Mosquera
20 October – Ricardo J. Caballero
1 December – Omar Aguilar

Deaths
14 June – Jerónimo Méndez (b. 1887)

References 

 
Years of the 20th century in Chile
Chile